Caesium lithium borate or cesium lithium borate (CsLiB6O10), also known as CLBO, is a non-linear crystal for ultraviolet applications and generates the fourth and fifth harmonics of the Nd:YAG fundamental laser wavelength (1064 nm).

Nonlinear optical properties of CLBO

References
.
.

Further reading
.
.

External links
Non-linear Crystal Cesium Lithium Borate (CsLiB6O10 or CLBO) from MolTech GmbH

Caesium compounds
Lithium compounds
Borates
Nonlinear optical materials